Johann Tobias Turley, also Thurley (4 August 1773 – 9 April 1829), was a German organ builder based in Brandenburg.

Life
Turley was born in Treuenbrietzen as the son of the baker Johann Friedrich Turley (1728–1783). After the early death of his father, he learned the same trade at the request of his mother. In 1793, he became a citizen and master baker in Treuenbrietzen. Turley was self-taught in organ building and in 1796 created a first organ in the Dorfkirche in Brachwitz.

In 1814, he gave up the baker's trade and turned entirely to organ building. From 1816 onwards, he received his first orders from the Potsdam government, such as for Hohenbruch. The organ expert and organist in Neuruppin Christian Friedrich Gottlieb Wilke advised him to give the metal plates for the organ pipes equal surfaces by means of a rolling and stretching machine to be developed. He first used the invention in his organ buildings in the Kreuzkirche in Joachimsthal and in Blankenburg (1817).

Turley was married twice. On 31 October 1793, he married Maria Louise Bergmann from Treuenbrietzen, who died in 1808.

His son Johann Friedrich Turley II. learned organ building from his father and assisted him in the last years of his life..

Turley died in Treuenbrietzen at the age of 55.

Selected works
Turley is said to have built 20 organs and carried out 30 repairs. 
Some new constructions have been preserved. Instruments that no longer exist are set in italics.

New organ buildings

References

Further reading
 Wolf Bergelt: Die Mark Brandenburg. Eine wiederentdeckte Orgellandschaft (Munich: Pape, 1988), pp. 103 f.
 Arthur Jaenicke: Tobias Thurley bäckt Semmeln und baut Orgeln (Berlin, 1960), biographic novel.

External links
 
 Kurzbiografie von Johann Tobias Turley 
 orgellandschaftbrandenburg.de: Orgelbauer
 Allgemeine musikalische Zeitung. No. 33, 1829, pp. 551f.

1773 births
1829 deaths
German pipe organ builders
People from Treuenbrietzen